Calylophus serrulatus is a species of flowering plant in the Onagraceae known by the common name yellow sundrops. Other common names include halfshrub sundrop, serrate-leaved evening primrose, shrubby evening primrose, plains yellow primrose, and halfleaf sundrop. It is native to central North America, including central Canada and the central United States.

The yellow flowers bloom between March to November and have four petals. They open in the morning and close in the afternoon. They fade orange or pink with age. The fruit is a cylindrical capsule. It grows in dry, open plains and prairies.

This drought- and heat-tolerant species grows in many types of substrate, including caliche, limestone, and gypsum. The leaves turn so that their edges face the sun, an adaptation to hot conditions.

References

External links

Onagraceae
Flora of Canada
Flora of the North-Central United States
Flora of the United States
Flora of the South-Central United States
Flora of the Canadian Prairies
Flora of the Great Plains (North America)
Flora of the Great Lakes region (North America)
Taxa named by Thomas Nuttall